Rachel Davies is an English actress. She has numerous television credits to her name, including Boon (1986), A Little Bit Of Lippy (1989), Emmerdale (1993–94), Band of Gold (1995–96), Hillsborough (1996), and The Chase (2006–07).

Career
Born in Manchester, Lancashire, she has played leading roles in the following series: Boon, The Cuckoo Waltz, Making Out, Band of Gold, Telltale, Emmerdale, Nice Guy Eddie, Linda Green and The Chase. She appeared in the acclaimed single drama Hillsborough. In 2000 she played Estelle in the last film that had John Thaw in the lead role, Buried Treasure.

Guest roles on TV include: Z-Cars, Coronation Street, The Sweeney, All Creatures Great and Small, Last of the Summer Wine, Doctor Who (in the serial State of Decay), The Professionals, Tales Of The Unexpected, Grange Hill Juliet Bravo, Minder, C.A.T.S. Eyes, Cracker, Midsomer Murders, Dangerfield, Casualty, The Bill, Holby City, Heartbeat, Bodies, Doctors and Waterloo Road.

Davies starred in the 1984 British comedy, A Private Function as Mr Wormold's landlady, Mrs Forbes.

Filmography

References

External links
 

English soap opera actresses
Living people
Actresses from Manchester
Year of birth missing (living people)